The China National Petroleum Corporation (CNPC) is a major national oil and gas corporation of China and one of the largest integrated energy groups in the world. Its headquarters are in Dongcheng District, Beijing. CNPC was ranked fourth in 2022 Fortune Global 500, a global ranking of the largest corporations by revenue.

Corporate structure
CNPC is the government-owned parent company of publicly listed PetroChina, which was created on November 5, 1999, as part of the restructuring of CNPC. In the restructuring, CNPC injected into PetroChina most of the assets and liabilities of CNPC relating to its hydrocarbon exploration and production, refining and marketing, chemicals and natural gas businesses. CNPC and PetroChina develop overseas assets through a joint venture, the CNPC Exploration & Development Company (CNODC), which is 50% owned by PetroChina.

In March 2014, CNPC Chairman Zhou Jiping announced that CNPC would be opening six business units to private investors.

CNPC also has a memorandum of understanding with UOP Llc, under which the two companies will collaborate on a range of biofuels technologies and projects in China.

History
Unlike the Chinese Petroleum Corporation (CPC Corporation), which was relocated to Taiwan with the retreat of the Republic of China following the communist revolution in 1949, CNPC can be traced from the beginning as a governmental department of the Government of the People's Republic of China. In 1949, the Chinese government formed a 'Fuel Industry Ministry' dedicated to the management of fuel. In January 1952 a division of the fuel ministry was formed to manage petroleum exploration and mining, called the 'Chief Petroleum Administration Bureau'. In July 1955 a new ministry was created to replace the Fuel Industry Ministry, called the Ministry of Petroleum. From 1955 to 1969, approximately 4 oil fields were found in 4 areas in Qinghai, Heilongjiang (Daqing oilfield), Bohai Bay and Songliao basin. CNPC was created on 17 September 1988, when the government decided to create a state-owned company to handle all Petroleum activities in China and disbanded the Ministry of Petroleum.

CNPC's international operations began in 1993. The CNPC subsidiary SAPET signed a service contract with the government of Peru to operate Block VII in the Talara Province basin. This was followed by an oil contract with the government of Sudan "In June 1997, the Greater Nile Petroleum Operating Company was established with the China National Petroleum Corporation (CNPC) taking 40 percent ownership". 
In August 2005 it was announced that CNPC agreed to buy the Alberta-based PetroKazakhstan for US$4.18 billion, then the largest overseas acquisition by a Chinese company. The acquisition went through on 26 October 2005 after a Canadian court turned down an attempt by LUKoil to block the sale. In 2006 67% of shares were sold from the parent company to PetroChina
In June 1997, the company bought a 60.3% stake in the Aktobe Oil Company of Kazakhstan, and in July 1997 CNPC won an oil contract for the Intercampo oilfield and East Caracoles oilfield in Venezuela.

In July 1998, the government restructured the company in accordance with the upstream and downstream principle of the oil industry. and CNPC spun off most of its domestic assets into a separate company, PetroChina. On 5 November 2007, HK listed PetroChina was listed as an A-share in the Shanghai Stock Exchange.

In 2012, a CNPC subsidiary, the Bank of Kunlun, was sanctioned because of its financial relationship with the Islamic Revolutionary Guard Corps and the Quds Force.

In July 2013, CNPC and Eni signed a $4.2 billion deal to acquire a 20% stake in a Mozambique offshore natural gas block.

In June 2014, the "head of a key China National Petroleum subsidiary was recalled to Beijing" and fell "from public view". Replacement of China National Petroleum's top representative in Canada was announced in July.

Operations

In 2007, CNPC produced 54 billion cubic metres of natural gas. CNPC has 30 international exploration and production projects with operations in Azerbaijan, Canada, Iran, Indonesia, Myanmar, Oman, Peru, Sudan, Niger, Thailand, Turkmenistan, and Venezuela. Many of the company's exploration projects are carried out by the Great Wall Drilling Company (GWDC), a wholly owned drilling services company.

In 2018 the company announced it is building natural gas storage facilities with a total capacity of 55.6 billion cu m in the northern Henan province, to ease supply bottlenecks in the peak winter season. China has accelerated the construction of underground gas storage facilities due to the challenges faced in transporting gas last winter when logistical issues forced buyers to truck LNG thousands of kilometers from import terminals to consumption areas. The country has started an ambitious program to convert large numbers of coal-fired boilers to cleaner natural gas, to curb smog and pollution.

Africa

South Sudan
CNPC is a major investor in South Sudan's oil sector. The company is major stockholder in Petrodar consortiums.

The Great Wall Drilling Company, a subsidiary of the China National Petroleum Company, invested $700 million in drilling 57 wells in Sudan over a 3-year period starting in 1997. In 2010, the company was awarded a contract by the Sudanese Petroleum Ministry to build 5 oil rigs for $75.5 million.

Central Asia

Afghanistan
In December 2011, Afghanistan signed a deal with CNPC for the development of oil blocks in the Amu Darya basin, a project expected to earn billions of dollars over two decades; the deal covers drilling and a refinery in the northern provinces of Sar-e Pol and Faryab and is the first international oil production agreement entered into by the Afghan government for several decades.

Kazakhstan
CNPC is one of the most active Chinese companies in the petroleum sector in Kazakhstan. It is heavily involved in the development of Kazakh oil after the acquisition of Alberta-based PetroKazakhstan, a company with all operations in Kazakhstan. The company was purchased for $4.18 billion.  Political resistance in Kazakhstan to the deal was placated by the sale of a minority stake in PetroKazakhstan by CNPC to KazMunaiGaz, the Kazakh state-owned oil company.

Pakistan

In 2008, all of GWDC operations and assets in Pakistan were acquired by Chuanqing Drilling Engineering Company Limited (CCDC) another subsidiary of CNPC.

Uzbekistan
In 2006, CNPC formed an international consortium with state-run Uzbekneftegaz, LUKoil Overseas, Petronas, and Korea National Oil Corporation to explore and develop oil and gas fields in the Aral Sea.

East Asia

China
In October 2004, CNPC began construction of a pipeline from the Middle East to Xinjiang province.

Europe

Russia
In May 2014, A 30-year deal between Russia's Gazprom and China National Petroleum Corporation (CNPC) which was 10 years in the making was estimated worth $400 billion. The agreement was signed at a summit in Shanghai and is expected to deliver some 38 billion cubic meters of natural gas a year, starting around 2018,  to China's burgeoning economy.

Oceania

New Zealand
CNPC operated in New Zealand as CCDC (NZ) Drilling and had one drilling rig, a triple stand DC rig named Rig 43. CCDC NZ started workover/drilling operations in the Kapuni gas fields of South Taranaki New Zealand in late 2012 for "tight gas". The rig completed the Kapuni drilling campaign of 4 wells for STOS (Shell Todd Oil Services) in August 2013. Its next drilling project commenced August 2013 for Tag Oil with one well successfully drilled at Cheal C of a depth of just under 5,000m. The rig was then stood down pending appeals for the next stage of a drilling campaign for Tag Oil in March 2014. Due to the periods involved it was decided to end its drilling campaign in New Zealand. Rig 43 was then dismantled and shipped to other overseas locations and no longer operates in New Zealand.

Southeast Asia

Malaysia 
China Petroleum Pipeline Engineering, a unit of CNPC, was the primary contractor working to establish two pipelines in Malaysia. The project was accused of involvement in corruption and was suspended by the Pakatan Harapan seventh cabinet of Malaysian Prime Minister Mahathir Mohamed in 2018. The company denied the allegations. In July 2019, Malaysian authorities seized $243.5M from China Petroleum Pipeline Engineering to compensate for the paid for but unfinished pipelines and transferred to a Malaysian government-owned business.

West Asia

Iraq

In March 2009, CNPC began development of Ahdab, an oil field in Wasit Governorate holding a modest one billion barrels,  becoming "the first significant foreign investors" in Iraq. The contract is a renegotiated version of a 1997 agreement between China and Iraq under Saddam Hussein. The project progressed despite security problems with local farmers.  Dozens of farmers complained of damage to property because of work on the site and Iraqi oil officials claimed thievery from the oil site by local farmers.  Adhab is not expected to be a major profit center, earning the company a projected 1 percent profit, but the field was seen as an entry strategy into Iraq.

Following Adhab, CNPC obtained a production contract during the 2009/2010 Iraqi oil services contracts tender to develop the much larger "Rumaila field" with joint venture partner BP, which contains an estimated  of oil. It is expected that crude oil production from Rumaila will expand by 10% by the end of 2010 once the BP PLC/CNPC consortium takes over development of the field in June 2010. A contract was also awarded to a consortium led by CNPC (37.5%), including TotalEnergies (18.75%) and Petronas (18.75%) for the "Halfaya field" in the south of Iraq, which contains an estimated  of oil.

Iran
CNPC became increasingly involved in the development of Iranian oil fields following Western sanctions that targeted the Iranian oil and gas sectors leading many European energy companies such as Shell Oil, Repsol, etc. to shut down operations in Iran. The CNPC along with Sinopec has been involved in various projects relating to Iran's oil/gas development. As of 2011, CNPC has been developing Iran's age-old Masjed Soleyman Oil Field, the oldest oil field of the Middle East, together with Iranian counterpart NIOC in a deal worth 200 million dollars. Production from this particular oil field was expected to increase in 2011 from  a day to  after the completion of the first phase, and to  following the completion of phase 2 of the project.

In August 2018, TotalEnergies officially withdrew from the Iranian South Pars gas field because of sanctions pressure from the US, leaving CNPC to take up their 50.1% stake in the $5 billion natural gas field, of which it had already 30%. It held this 80.1% share until it withdrew its investment in October 2019 due to the US sanctions on Iran, according to Oil Minister Bijan Zangeneh quoted by the SHANA news agency.

Syria
CNPC with Indian state oil firm, ONGC created a joint venture to acquire minority stakes ranging from about 33.3% to 39% in several mature Syrian oil and natural gas properties.  The combined entity was a notable instance of cooperation between two state oil firms that regularly competed for assets around the world.

Controversies

Corruption allegations 
In September 2013, Jiang Jiemin, a former chairman of PetroChina, a subsidiary of CNPC, was abruptly removed from his role as director of the State-owned Assets Supervision and Administration Commission of the State Council and investigated for corruption and abuse of power, along with four other senior oil executives. Jiang was considered an ally of corrupt former security chief Zhou Yongkang, and part of a group of officials that had political ties with Zhou. On October 12, 2015, the court found Jiang guilty on all counts, including accepting bribes, possessing dark assets, and abusing his power. He was sentenced to 16 years in prison.

In January 2017, former PetroChina vice chairman Liao Yongyuan was sentenced to 15 years in prison for abuse of power and accepting nearly $2 million worth of bribes.

In October 2021, the Central Commission for Discipline Inspection announced that it was investigating former PetroChina vice president Ling Xiao, for “serious disciplinary violations.”

Lanzhou Petrochemical contamination 
In 2014, Lanzhou Petrochemical, a subsidiary of CNPC, was responsible for ethylene and ammonia leaks, benzene contamination of water supplies, and air pollution in Lanzhou. City officials criticized the company and demanded an apology.

2003: Chongqing deadly gas leakage
On 23 December 2003, a gas blowout occurred at the Luojia No. 16H gas well. The toxic fumes killed 243 people and hospitalized substantially more. Specialists concluded that the accident was the result of negligence on the part of Eastern Sichuan Drilling Company, which was working under China National Petroleum Corporation. They concluded that Sichuan technicians had failed to fix a blowout-prevention valve, a basic safety measure, that the gas well was built too close to homes, that workers failed to promptly inform authorities, that workers neglected to ignite the gas to prevent disaster, and that the company had not undergone an official environmental and safety assessment before commencing operations. On March 25, 2006, another leak in the Luojia No. 2 gas well in Chongqing required the evacuation of 15,000 people. Three attempts were required to properly seal the leak.

Suspension of operations in Chad
In August 2013, the operations of a CNPC subsidiary in Chad were suspended entirely by the country's government after it had violated environmental standards while drilling for crude oil in the south of the country. “We found flagrant violations of environmental standards by the company ... CNPC’s behavior was unacceptable,” said Le Bemadjiel, Chad's minister of oil. The minister also claimed that CNPC discharged oil intentionally to reduce costs, did not have facilities to clean spilled crude oil, dumped crude oil without safeguards, and asked locals to help remove crude oil without providing them with appropriate protective gear.

In March 2014, Chad fined CNPC worth a total of $1.2 billion. In August 2014, CNPC had five of its permits revoked after failing to pay the fine. In October 2014, CNPC agreed to pay $400 million.

Jilin chemical plant explosion

In November 2005, chemical plants belonging to PetroChina, a subsidiary of CNPC, exploded in Jilin, China, resulting in 100 tons of benzene, which is a carcinogen and toxic, pouring into the Songhua River. There was a slick of chemicals that spanned 80 kilometres. Harbin, another city along the Songhua River, had to cut the water supply from almost 4 million people, for 5 days. More than 60 people were injured, five died, and one person was missing due to the incident. The spill reached as far as Khabarovsk, Russia, where residents stocked up on bottled water. The Russian city tried filtering its water of toxic substances, but couldn't guarantee the water was safe. China's environmental agency fined the company one million yuan (approximately $125,000, £64,000) for its pollution, which was the maximum fine that can be handed out in China for breaking an environmental law. The Chinese government said that cleaning up the aftermath would require one billion US dollars. Li Zhaoxing, Chinese Foreign Minister at the time, issued a public apology to Russia due to the incident. The Chinese press responded harshly to the authorities' response to the disaster. Another gas pipeline exploded on 20 January 2006 in Sichuan. Reportedly, nine were killed and nearly 40 injured.

Oil spills

In January 2010, it was revealed that a CNPC diesel pipeline had burst near the confluence of the Chishui and Weihe rivers, in Huaxian County, Shaanxi. The extensive pollution ended up in the Yellow River, China's longest waterway.

In July 2010, two pipelines exploded at an oil storage depot belonging to China National Petroleum Corp near Dalian's Xingang Harbour in Liaoning province which spilled an estimated 1,500 tonnes of crude into the sea.

Trade anomalies 
On January 19, 2022, Chinese authorities punished CNPC's subsidiary "PetroChina Fuel Oil Co Ltd" for alleged oil trade inconsistencies that "severely disrupted oil products market order... facilitated blind development of outdated production capacity at independent refineries...caused losses in government tax revenue indirectly," said the National Development and Reform Commission.

Human rights 
In 2011, Earthrights International accused PetroChina, a subsidiary of CNPC, of complicity in serious human rights abuses in Burma, a country known for militarily furthering its economic interests through the use of forced labor.

Tax issues 
In January 2014, the International Consortium of Investigative Journalists published research based on leaked financial records from the British Virgin Islands, implicating CNPC, PetroChina, Sinopec, and CNOOC in offshore tax evasion.

See also

List of oil spills
CNPC (HK)
Petroleum industry in China

Notes

References

External links

CNPC Company Profile at Yahoo Finance

Oil companies of China
Natural gas companies of China
National oil and gas companies
Oil pipeline companies
Government-owned companies of China
Energy companies established in 1988
Non-renewable resource companies established in 1988
Chinese companies established in 1988
Dongcheng District, Beijing